The 1992 Yokohama 6-Hour for Production Cars was an endurance motor race staged at the Winton Circuit in Victoria, Australia on 29 November 1992. There were twenty one starters in the race, which was won by Mark Brame and Henry Draper driving a Suzuki Swift GTi.

Results

References

Yokohama 6-Hour for Production Cars